Sarah Hicks Stewart (born April 26, 1963) is an associate justice of the Supreme Court of Alabama.

Education 

She received both a Bachelor of Arts and Master of Arts in communications from the University of Arkansas. She went on to receive her Juris Doctor from the Vanderbilt University Law School.

Legal career 

She worked as a private practice attorney from 1992 until her judicial appointment; from 1996 to 2006 she was a senior partner.

Alabama Supreme Court 

In 2017 Stewart announced her candidacy for the Supreme Court for the seat being vacated by Glenn Murdock, who was not seeking reelection. In the primary, she faced incumbent Brady E. Mendheim Jr. who was appointed by the governor, along with another challenger. Mendheim conceded his loss to Stewart. Stewart went on to win the general election, facing no challenger. She was sworn into office on January 11, 2019. In January 2023, Stewart announced she was running for the position of chief justice to replace Chief Justice Tom Parker when he retires.

Personal life

She is married to her husband Craig R. Stewart, and they have two daughters.

References

External links 

1963 births
Living people
20th-century American lawyers
21st-century American judges
Alabama Republicans
Alabama state court judges
People from Fort Smith, Arkansas
Justices of the Supreme Court of Alabama
University of Arkansas alumni
Vanderbilt University Law School alumni
20th-century American women lawyers
21st-century American women judges